The 4 Reconnaissance Commando is a defunct South African Special Forces unit of the South African Defence Force that was formed in July 1978, specialising in amphibious operations.

History 

In 1976, during Operation Savannah, a need was identified for more operational special forces units and in particular units with more specialised skills. In March 1976, Major Malcolm Kinghorn formed a sub-unit specialising in amphibious operations for use in Angola during Operation Savannah. It was formed at Salisbury Island, Durban and consisted of a headquarters unit of Kinghorn and a NCO and two units of six men each and was called Charlie (C) Group of 1 Reconnaissance Commando.

On 1 May 1976, the Defence Minister approved the formation of 4 Reconnaissance Commando but it would take a further two years before it was formally established. The unit was formed on the 17 July 1978 as 4 Reconnaissance Commando at Langebaan with Major Kinghorn as the first commanding officer and the first RSM was Warrant Officer “Chili” du Plessis. It was initially made up of members of 1 Reconnaissance Commando. On 1 January 1979, Major Kinghorn was given a temporary rank of Commandant.  During the 1981 reorganisation, 4 Reconnaissance Commando was renamed 4 Reconnaissance Regiment (4RR). The unit was said to be small with mainly white soldiers who operated in Angola and Mozambique

Structure
In 1978, 4 Reconnaissance Commando was initially structured into three groups:

 Alpha Group – amphibious operations training,
 Bravo Group – operational,
 Charlie Group – diving,

but when 4 Reconnaissance Commando was renamed 4 Reconnaissance Regiment in 1981 it was structured as:

4.1 Commando – operational component with five teams:
 Diving Team – offensive operational attack divers
 Boat Team – maintain and operate the teams boats and work with the naval vessels crews
 Offensive Team – carried out the special forces tasks
 Small Teams – carry out reconnaissance and lead the offensive teams to the targets
 Reconnaissance Team – handle intelligence gathering operations in larger teams

4.2 Commando – training element later called Special Forces Amphibious and Urban School

Re-organisation after 1992
The next reorganisation occurred in 1992 when the Special Forces HQ was disbanded and renamed the Directorate Reconnaissance Forces and 4 RR remained but 2RR, the citizen force unit, was disbanded. In 1993, a further reorganisation occurred when the Directorate Reconnaissance Forces was renamed as the 45 Para Brigade and 4 Reconnaissance Commando was renamed the 453 Para Battalion. The last change occurred in 1995, 45 Para Brigade became the Special Forces Brigade and subsequently 453 Para Battalion is now called 4 Special Forces Regiment.

Commanding officers
Officers commanding were:

References

Further reading

External links 
 http://www.recce.co.za/cold-war-africa/

Special forces of South Africa
Defunct organisations based in South Africa
Military units and formations of South Africa in the Border War
Military units and formations established in 1978
Military units and formations disestablished in 1993